Dimitri Uznadze (December 2, 1886 – October 9, 1950, Tbilisi) was a Georgian psychologist and professor of psychology, co-founder of the Tbilisi State University (TSU) and of the Georgian Academy of Sciences (GAS).

Life and works 

Dimitri Uznadze was born in 1886 to a peasant family, in the small village of Sakara in the province of Kutaisi (Western Georgia). 
He was expelled from Kutaisi high school for taking part in the 1905 revolution.
That year he went to Switzerland and then to Germany, where he entered the philosophy faculty of Leipzig University, graduating in 1909. In 1910 he received a PhD degree at the University of Wittenberg (Halle, Germany) for his work Vladimir Solovev: His Epistemology and Metaphysics (1909). He graduated from Kharkiv University in 1913.
Returning home in 1909, from then until 1917 he taught history at the Kutaisi Georgian Gymnasium, and was headmaster of the Sinatle girls' school from 1915 to 1917.

After the October Revolution, Uznadze helped establish the Tbilisi State University (TSU). From 1918 to 1950, Uznadze was Professor and Head of the Department of Psychology of TSU.

In 1935 he received Dr.Sci. degree in Psychology.
In 1941 he co-founded the Georgian Academy of Sciences (GAS). From 1941 to 1950 he was first Director of the Institute of Psychology of the GAS (now the Uznadze Institute of Psychology).
In 1946 Uznadze received title of Meritorious Science Worker of Georgia.

Main fields of scientific activity of Dimitri Uznadze were: philosophy and psychology. He was also author of Theory of Attitude and Set and founder of Georgian school of the psychology of pedagogics. Uznadze's main scientific works are: "Wladimir Solowjow: seine Erkenntnistheorie und Metaphysik" (a monograph, in German, Halle, 1910); "Henri Bergson" (a monograph, in Russian, Tbilisi, 1923); "Untersuchungen zur Psychologie der Einstellung" ("Acta Psychologica", Vol.IV, No.3, 1939, in German); "The Psychology of Set" (a monograph, in English, New York City, 1966); "Psychological Investigations" (In Russian, English summary, Moscow, 1966).

Uznadze died on October 9, 1950, in Tbilisi. He is buried in the garden of the Tbilisi State University.

See also 

 List of Georgians
 List of psychologists

References

1886 births
1950 deaths
Scientists from Georgia (country)
Philosophers from Georgia (country)
Georgian psychologists
Academic staff of Tbilisi State University
Leipzig University alumni
Martin Luther University of Halle-Wittenberg alumni
National University of Kharkiv alumni
Members of the Georgian National Academy of Sciences
20th-century psychologists
20th-century philosophers
Burials in Georgia (country)